It's Time is the fourth studio album by Canadian singer, Michael Bublé. It was released on February 8, 2005 by 143 Records and Reprise Records. With arrangements by David Foster, the album contains cover versions of songs from traditional pop and contemporary pop: George Gershwin, Cole Porter, Stevie Wonder, and The Beatles. And it includes "Home", a song co-written by Bublé.

Despite some unfavorable reviews, the album was a commercial success, topping the charts in Canada, Italy, and Spain, while  peaking in the top ten in eleven other countries. The Recording Industry Association of America (RIAA) certified it three-times platinum, for shipments of three million copies across the United States. In Australia, the album was certified five times Platinum by the Australian Recording Industry Association (ARIA) for sales of 350,000 copies sold, and in Canada it was certified six times Platinum by the Canadian Recording Industry Association (CRIA) for sales of 600,000 copies.

Singles
In the U.S., "Home" reached No. 72 on the Billboard Hot 100 chart, while topping the Adult Contemporary chart. It also reached the top forty on the Adult Pop Songs and Digital Songs charts.

"Home" peaked at No. 35 in Australia, No. 31 in the UK, and No. 1 in ten countries.

Bublé credits the success of It's Time, which sold six million copies by 2011, to "Home." It was the most played song on Canadian radio in 2006. It's Time sold well in Japan, Italy, and Australia, and charted in the top ten singles in both the U.K. and U.S. charts. Bublé said that during the recording of It's Time he "came into [his] own as a songwriter" and hearing his own song on the radio made him feel "like a true artist." He acknowledged that a downside to producing covers of well-loved songs is that people often compare them to the original; in writing his own song, he says, he found a sense of freedom. Bublé feels that the song is distinct in comparison to the other songs on the album because of its "country-pop twang" and more-relatable lyrics. The song was written collaboratively with Amy Foster-Gillies, Nashville native and daughter of successful Canadian musician David Foster. In his 2011 autobiography, Onstage Offstage, Bublé states that then-girlfriend Debbie Timuss was his inspiration for the song. Timuss sang backing vocals on "Home" and appeared in the music video, which was filmed in the Orpheum Theater in Vancouver, Canada. "Home" won the 2006 Juno Award for single of the year. A cover version was recorded by American country singer Blake Shelton. Shelton's version of Bublé's song landed him top of the charts for R&R Singles Chart and MediaBase Singles. Shelton was quoted in saying," I loved 'Home' the first time I heard it, and I really love it now," said Shelton. "I'm glad I'm not the only one that thought it was a country song. I've had the honor of performing "Home" with Michael Bublé on a couple of occasions and can honestly say he is a really great guy, and I think as a writer he's probably pretty excited that it's reached number one, too."

Bublé attributes the song's popularity to its universal theme, stating that "[w]e all know what it's like to be homesick. It's one of the worst feelings. I know about that as well as anybody."  "Home" was also featured on the soundtrack of the 2005 American romantic comedy The Wedding Date along with other songs from Bublé's albums.

Other singles
"Feeling Good" was released as the first international single from the album on April 4, 2005. Although the single failed to chart in the United States, it managed to chart on the Austria Singles Chart at No. 66 and on the Dutch Singles Chart at No.62. It also charted in the United Kingdom, peaking at No. 69.

Critical reception

The album received mixed reviews from contemporary music critics, with positive attention given to Bublé's vocals. Aaron Latham of AllMusic gave the album four out of five stars and felt that the album "mine[d] the rich history of pop music" as he noted that Bublé applied "his own technique to classic standards and incorporate[d] his Rat Pack sound into modern pop songs". The songs "Home", "Can't Buy Me Love", "Song for You", and "You and I" were called the highlights of the album. Woodrow Wilkins from All About Jazz commended how It's Time was "relevant to today's audience" and noted that Bublé "delivers [the songs] with the heart and passion that only a person who claims ownership of these titles can muster". However, Caroline Sullivan of The Guardian didn't appreciate the album's composition of jazz and pop covers, saying that "Sinatra is turning in his grave". Amy Lichty of the Daily Emerald said that "Bublé's clear voice and smooth rhythms keep the CD moving along", but also noted that he "is simply no match for either Sinatra or Connick"

Track listing

Personnel 
Musicians
 Michael Bublé – vocals
 Neil Devor – programming 
 Randy Waldman – acoustic piano (1, 2, 9, 12)
 Jochem van der Saag – programming (1, 5, 6, 8, 10), sound design (1, 5, 6, 8, 10), organ (6, 10), harmonica (10)
 Alan Chang – acoustic piano (3)
 David Foster – keyboards (4), acoustic piano (5, 8, 11, 13), bass (8, 10)
 Tamir Hendelman – acoustic piano (6, 7, 10)
 Dean Parks – guitars (1, 3, 5, 10), electric guitar (9)
 Brian Green – guitars (2, 3, 5), guitar solo (3, 5), acoustic guitar (9)
 Heitor Pereira – guitars (4)
 Anthony Wilson – guitars (7)
 Michael Thompson – electric guitar (8), guitars (12)
 Brandon Jenner – acoustic guitar (8)
 John Chiodini – guitars (12)
 Brian Bromberg – bass (1-5, 9, 11, 12, 13)
 Robert Hurst – bass (6)
 Christian McBride – bass (7)
 Vinnie Colaiuta – drums (1, 3, 4, 5, 8, 9, 11)
 Dave Tull – drums (2, 13)
 Jeff Hamilton – drums (6, 7, 10)
 Frank Capp – drums (12)
 Rafael Padilla – percussion (1, 2, 4, 5, 6, 8)
 Dan Higgins – flute (4), saxophone (4)
 Jeff Clayton – lead alto saxophone (7)
 Keith Fiddmont – alto saxophone (7)
 Lee Callet – baritone saxophone (7)
 Charles Owens – tenor saxophone (7)
 Rickey Woodard – tenor saxophone (7), tenor sax solo (7)
 Bill Reichenbach Jr. – bass trombone (7)
 George Bohanon – trombone (7)
 Ira Nepus – trombone (7)
 Ryan Porter – trombone (7)
 Gilbert Castellanos – trumpet (7)
 Sal Cracchiolo – trumpet (7)
 Kye Palmer – trumpet (7)
 Bijon Watson – trumpet (7)
 Chris Botti – trumpet solo (11)
 Nelly Furtado – vocals (4)
 Debbie Timuss – backing vocals (5)

Arrangements
 David Foster – arrangements (1, 3-6, 8, 9, 11, 13)
 Don Sebesky – arrangements (1)
 Bill Holman – arrangements (2)
 William Ross – arrangements (3, 5, 9, 11)
 Jorge Calandrelli – string arrangements (4)
 John Clayon Jr. – arrangements (6, 7, 10)
 Jerry Hey – arrangements (8)
 Nelson Riddle – original arrangements (12)
 Sammy Nestico – orchestration (12)
 Jeremy Lubbock – arrangements (13)
 Julie Eidsvoog, Joann Kane and Suzie Katayama – music preparation
 Debbi Datz-Pyle and Patti Zimmitti – music contractors
 Shari Sutcliffe – horn contractor (7)

Production 
 David Foster – producer (1-6, 8-13)
 Humberto Gatica – producer (1-6, 8-13), recording (1-6, 8-13), mixing (1-6, 8-13)
 Tommy LiPuma – producer (7)
 Al Schmitt – recording (7), mixing (7)
 Neil Devor – additional engineer (1-6, 8-13), digital audio engineer (1-6, 8-13)
 Alejandro Rodriguez – additional engineer (1-6, 8-13), digital audio engineer (1-6, 8-13)
 Cristian Robles – digital audio engineer (1-6, 8-13), orchestral mix assistant 
 Jorge Vivo – digital audio engineer (1-6, 8-13), additional engineer (8)
 Joe Wolhmuth – digital audio engineer (1-6, 8-13)
 Jason Larian – assistant engineer (1-6, 8-13)
 Andy Brohard – assistant engineer (7)
 Wil Donovan – assistant engineer (7)
 Bruce Monical – assistant engineer (7)
 Steve Genewick – Pro Tools engineer (7)
 Jason Carson – orchestral recording assistant 
 Wade Childers – orchestral recording assistant 
 Norm Dlugatch – orchestral recording assistant 
 Alex Gibson – orchestral recording assistant 
 Dominic Gonzales – orchestral recording assistant 
 Anthony Kilhoffer – orchestral recording assistant 
 Patrick Spain – orchestral recording assistant 
 Rich Toenes – orchestral recording assistant 
 Mark Valentine – orchestral recording assistant 
 Paul Wertheimer – orchestral recording assistant 
 Courtney Blooding – orchestral mix assistant, production coordinator 
 Vlado Meller – mastering
 Kathy Frangetis – production coordinator 
 Mick Haggerty – art direction, design
 Olaf Heine – photography 
 Hugo Boss – wardrobe 
 Bruce Allen – management 

Studios
 Recorded and Mixed at Chartmaker Studios (Malibu, California) and Capitol Studios (Hollywood, California). Additional recording at The Village Recorder (Los Angeles, California).
 Orchestra recorded at Henson Recording Studios and Paramount Recording Studios (Hollywood, California); Record Plant, Signet Sound Studios and Warner Bros. Sound Stage (Los Angeles, California); Mixed at Chartmaker Studios.
 Mastered at Sony Music Studios (New York City, New York).

Charts

Weekly charts

Year-end charts

Decade-end charts

Certifications and sales

References

143 Records albums
2005 albums
Albums produced by David Foster
Albums produced by Humberto Gatica
Albums recorded at Capitol Studios
Albums recorded at Henson Recording Studios
Juno Award for Album of the Year albums
Juno Award for Pop Album of the Year albums
Michael Bublé albums
Reprise Records albums